Robert Charles Francis  (born 1942) is a New Zealand politician and former rugby union referee. Francis was the mayor of Masterton from 1986 until 2007, and chair of the Wairarapa District Health Board from 2006 to 2013.

Early years
Francis originally played rugby union, but stopped due to asthma and instead concentrated on refereeing.

Referee career
Francis started as a referee aged 18 in 1961. He went on to control almost 100 first-class matches. This included 12 Ranfurly Shield games and 10 test matches. During the 1980s, he was rated the world's number one referee.

Francis later served as the chairman of the New Zealand Referee Association for 14 years and was on the referee selection panel for several Rugby World Cups. In 2014, at the World Rugby Awards, he was awarded the International Rugby Board Referee Award for distinguished service to the game as a referee.

Political career
Francis was elected as Mayor of Masterton in 1986 and held the position for 21 years, until 2007. In the 1991 New Year Honours, he was appointed a Member of the Order of the British Empire for services to local government and the community.

In 2005 Francis, a long time member of the New Zealand Labour Party, was expected to be selected as its candidate for Wairarapa electorate at the 2005 general election to replace the retiring Georgina Beyer. However the party instead selected Denise MacKenzie. Francis had previously turned down an approach by the New Zealand National Party to contest the electorate for them in the 2002 election.

In 2006 Francis was appointed as the chairperson of the Wairarapa District Health Board as well as the board of the Fire Service Commission. He chaired the Wairarapa DHB until 2013.

In 2012 Francis was appointed as a member of the Capital and Coast District Health Board.

Honours and awards
In the 1991 New Year Honours, Francis was appointed Member of the Order of the British Empire (MBE) for services to local government and the community. Francis was made a Companion of the Queen's Service Order for public services in the 2002 Queen's Birthday and Golden Jubilee Honours. In the 2021 Queen's Birthday Honours, Francis was appointed a Companion of the New Zealand Order of Merit, for services to the community and conservation.

Later years
His wife, Eva, died in 2014. A biography of Francis, written by Gary Caffell, was published in 2015.

References

New Zealand rugby union referees
Mayors of Masterton
Sportspeople from Masterton
New Zealand sportsperson-politicians
1942 births
New Zealand Labour Party politicians
New Zealand Members of the Order of the British Empire
Companions of the Queen's Service Order
Living people
Capital and Coast District Health Board members
Companions of the New Zealand Order of Merit
New Zealand justices of the peace